Grand Lake is a lake in St. Louis County, in the U.S. state of Minnesota.

Grand Lake was so named on account of its relatively large size.

See also
List of lakes in Minnesota

References

Lakes of Minnesota
Lakes of St. Louis County, Minnesota